Adrián Fernández Mier (born April 20, 1963 in Mexico City, CDMX, Mexico) is a Mexican former professional race car driver and he was co-owner of the Fernandez Racing team.

Racing career

Early career
Fernández began his career in Mexico by racing motocross at the age of eight. He entered his first auto race in 1981 at the "24 Hours of Mexico" race in Mexico City and at the age of 15 he made the permanent move to cars in 1982. From 1982 to 1984 Fernández competed in the Formula Vee Championship taking the title in '83 and '84. He also raced in the Formula K Series in 1984, competing in that series through 1986. He finished in the top four in the standings all three years in Formula K.

In 1987, he ran one race in the Benelux Formula Ford 1600 Championship, one British RAC Formula Ford 1600 Championship race and competed in the Formula Ford Festival at Brands Hatch. From 1988 to 1989 he ran the British RAC and Esso Formula Ford 1600 Championship series before moving to the Mexican F3 Championship for 1990 and 1991, winning the title in '91.

In 1992, Fernández came to the United States to compete in the Firestone Indy Lights Championship (now the PPG-Dayton Indy Lights Championship). He finished third in the points winning four races, a rookie record, and took the "Indy Lights Rookie of the Year" honors and made more than two million dollars in prize earnings.

CART and IRL (1993–2004)
His talent apparent, Fernández made the jump to the CART IndyCar World Series in 1993, competing in five races for Galles Racing International. He ran his first full CART season in 1994 with Galles finishing 13th and capturing the "Marco Magaña" and "Luchador Olmeca" awards and the "JAC" trophy for "Best Driver" outside Mexico. Competing again with Galles in 1995, Fernández finished 12th in the standings placing in the top ten nine times.

Fernández moved to Tasman Motorsports in 1996. He had six top ten finishes, including his first career CART victory at Toronto.  Unfortunately his delight at taking his first win was dampened by the fatal accident suffered by Jeff Krosnoff late in the race.  The win in Toronto made him the first Mexican to win a CART event since Héctor Rebaque in 1982, and Fernández went on to finish 12th in the season points tally. However, 1997 was a disappointing season for Fernández. The Tasman team ran a Lola chassis which failed to perform to expectations. Through force of will, determination and talent, Fernández battled to three top ten finishes and 18th place in the PPG Cup standings.

Fernández joined Patrick Racing for the 1998 season and proved his ability to challenge for the championship. He enjoyed 14 top ten finishes with eight top five placements and two victories, Japan and Mid-Ohio, en route to a fourth place showing in the PPG Cup race during the 1998 FedEx Championship. He captured his first career pole at Michigan and led the championship race for the first time in his career.  Unfortunately once again Fernández was touched by tragedy — a crash at Michigan resulted in an errant wheel from his car flying into the stands and killing three spectators.  However, it was his victory during the Miller Lite 200 that gave Patrick Racing one of its most memorable moments when Fernández stood atop the podium next to his teammate Scott Pruett. Fernández was also named the "Athlete of the Year" in Mexico.

In 1999, enjoying his most successful season so far in the CART series, Adrián Fernández behind the wheel of the #40 Tecate/Quaker State Reynard Ford-Cosworth completed the year sixth in the championship battle. He led the points series early in the season for the first time in his CART career, however an accident at Detroit resulted in a fracture in one of his hands, forcing him to sit out for several races. However he won at Motegi, Japan at the Firestone Firehawk 500 and at the Marlboro 500 at Fontana, California — a race marred by the death of good friend Greg Moore.  In addition, he was selected to participate in the IROC series during 1999 where he competed against other top-named drivers including NASCAR drivers Jeff Gordon, Terry Labonte and Dale Earnhardt.  Fernández solid racing career which began in 1993, now has 80 total starts in the series. Of those starts he has finished in the top ten 41 times throughout his seven-year career.

In 2000 Fernández had his best season in the CART series, coming close to winning the championship despite not starting on the front row all season. He scored points in 17 of the 20 races including 2 wins at Rio de Janeiro, Brazil and Australia, and 3 further podium results. He finished second to Gil de Ferran in the championship.

In 2001 he founded Fernandez Racing, with former Ganassi manager Tom Anderson as his partner, and ex-F1 driver Shinji Nakano as his teammate. He finished 3rd twice and took 2 poles that year, but his team's first victory came at Portland in 2003, the first win for an owner-driver since Bobby Rahal achieved the feat in 1992. That year he also ran an IRL entry for Asian-American Roger Yasukawa, in partnership with Aguri Suzuki, and for 2004 he moved the whole team to the series. Despite taking 3 wins and 4th overall in the 2004 IRL, he was unable to secure funding to race in 2005 - Delphi was driver Scott Sharp's personal sponsor while engine suppliers Honda insisted on Japanese driver Kosuke Matsuura in the second car.

Busch Series (2005–06)
In 2005, he drove the No. 5 Lowe's / Hitachi Chevrolet in Mexico for Hendrick Motorsports in the first NASCAR Busch Series race held outside the United States.  In this race (called the Telcel-Motorola 200), Fernández raced in a one-time ride to help promote NASCAR racing to the local fans.  He led several laps in the race before giving up the lead to eventual race winner Martin Truex Jr. It was announced that he would run four more races in the Busch Series for Hendrick Motorsports, but he did not run up front at any of those races. In 2006, he competed in two Busch races for Hendrick and competed full time in the Grand-Am series for his own team with Lowe's sponsorship.

ALMS (2007–present)

In 2007, Fernández moved the team to the American Le Mans Series LMP2 class as an Acura factory team. His teammate was fellow Mexican and Grand-Am veteran Luis Díaz.

On October 10, 2009, Fernández and his co-driver Luis Díaz won at the Mazda Raceway Laguna Seca in Monterey, California. With this victory the Lowe's Fernandez Racing Acura ARX-01B concludes the season with the drivers' championship and teams' championship of the American Le Mans Series in the LMP2 category.

24 Hours of Le Mans

In the 2007 Fernández debuts with a second place in the LMP2 category in the famous race with the Barazi-Epsilon team Zytek aboard a 07S/2 a 3.4-liter V8 prototype. His teammates were Haruki Kurosawa and Robbie Kerr. This was the first podium of a Mexican at the Circuit de la Sarthe in many years to remember those achieved by Ricardo and Pedro Rodríguez in 1962 and 1968 respectively. The English-French team took pole position on its category.

After three years of absence Fernández back in the 2010 now competing in LMP1 class with Aston Martin Racing finished fifth in his category (sixth absolute) with a Lola-Aston Martin B09/60, his co-drivers were Harold Primat and Stefan Mücke.

The luck did not favor Adrian in 2011, when his team the Aston Martin Racing in LMP1 class can barely afford 2 laps with their Aston Martin AMR-One and leave the test due to problems with the engine running at the 56th site.

In the 80th., edition of the 2012, Fernández and the Aston Martin Racing Team got the third place in the GTE-Pro class along with his co-drivers the Stefan Mücke and Darren Turner, their Aston Martin Vantage 4.5 L-V8 covered a total of 332 laps (2,811.65 miles), in the Circuit de la Sarthe without failure or serious mechanical problems. Also the team achieved the fastest lap of the category with 3 minutes and 54,928 seconds. Adrián had the honor to drive the last stage of the competition.

On September 12, 2012, Fernández announced that his participation in the FIA World Endurance Championship concludes at the end of the season, as well his relationship with the Aston Martin Racing team that started in 2010. The Mexican driver will focus on competitions in the United States.

Sergio Pérez's manager
On September 28, 2012 Formula One driver Sergio Pérez announced that Férnandez will be his manager.

Turn 12 Adrián Fernández
On September 20, 2016, Fernández's achievements have been recognised by the naming of Turn 12 of the Autodromo Hermanos Rodriguez in his honour.

Personal life

Fernández retired from motorsports in 2012. He has two children: Valentina and Niko Fernández, and he married long time girlfriend and former beauty queen, author and retired actress Priscila Perales on October 21, 2017. They got married on May 4, 2018, in Miami Beach, Florida. The happy couple announced their son Adrián Fernández Jr. was born on October 29, 2020.

Motorsports career results

American Open-Wheel
(key)

CART results

IndyCar Series results

Complete American Le Mans Series results

24 Hours of Le Mans results

NASCAR
(key) (Bold – Pole position awarded by qualifying time. Italics – Pole position earned by points standings or practice time. * – Most laps led.)

Nationwide Series

International Race of Champions
(key) (Bold – Pole position. * – Most laps led.)

References

Bibliography

External links

 Official website
 

1965 births
24 Hours of Le Mans drivers
American Le Mans Series drivers
Champ Car drivers
Rolex Sports Car Series drivers
Indianapolis 500 drivers
Indy Lights drivers
IndyCar Series drivers
IndyCar Series team owners
International Race of Champions drivers
European Le Mans Series drivers
Living people
Mexican expatriates in the United States
Mexican people of Spanish descent
Mexican racing drivers
Mexican Indianapolis 500 drivers
NASCAR drivers
Racing drivers from Mexico City
FIA World Endurance Championship drivers
Hendrick Motorsports drivers
Mexican Formula Three Championship drivers
Aston Martin Racing drivers
Tasman Motorsports drivers
Mo Nunn Racing drivers
JR Motorsports drivers
Team Aguri drivers